Wu Chuo-liu, born Wu Jiantian  (2 June 1900, Xinpu, Hsinchu – 7 October 1976, Taipei?) was an influential Taiwanese journalist and novelist of Hakka ancestry.  He has been described as the most powerful witness to history in Taiwanese letters.  Many of his most important novels were first written in Japanese.

Life and work

His family was long established in Xinpu County, which is located approximately 60 km Southwest of Taipei.  His grandfather, Wu Fangxin, was a well-known traditional poet. He began with a standard Chinese education but, due to the Japanese occupation, most of his studies were conducted in the Japanese manner. In 1916, he was admitted to the "". In 1919, he visited Japan for the first time on a school trip that lasted 18 days—it was an eye opener.  He graduated in 1920 and became a teacher in the public schools.

After publishing an article called "School and Autonomy", he was labeled a radical by the Japanese government and transferred to a village school in Miaoli County. Ten years later, he managed to secure an appointment as "" of the schools in Guanxi, but he resigned in 1940, following an incident in which the teachers were insulted by the Japanese authorities.

In 1941, he went to mainland China and worked as a reporter in Nanjing for Mainland News (大陸新聞). These experiences served as the inspiration for his most famous work, Orphan of Asia, a semi-autobiographical account of the experiences of a fictional protagonist named Hu Taiming during the course of the colonial period. This work, which highlighted the ambiguity and tension inherent in being Taiwanese, has since become a key text in the contentious subject of Taiwanese identity. He is also known for his autobiography The Fig Tree.

In 1964, Wu was one of the founders of the magazine , which served as a starting point for many of Taiwan's young aspiring writers.  At that time though, emphasizing Taiwanese identity was still politically controversial and Wu was pressured by the authorities to drop 'Taiwan' from the title of his magazine.  He demurred: "what I want to promote is Taiwan native literature and arts.  Drop 'Taiwan' [from the title] and the whole venture loses its meaning".  The title stayed.

It remains one of Taiwans's prestigious literary awards to this day.

He died in 1976, following a brief illness.

Bibliography

References

External links
WU ZHUOLIU ARCHIVE by Research Center for Humanities and Social Sciences at National Chung Hsin University, Taiwan

20th-century Taiwanese poets
Hakka writers
Taiwanese people of Hakka descent
People from Hsinchu County
20th-century Taiwanese educators
Taiwanese male novelists
1900 births
1976 deaths
20th-century novelists
Taiwanese schoolteachers
20th-century male writers
Taiwanese journalists